Boswell may refer to:

Places

Canada
 Boswell, British Columbia, a rural community
 Boswell, British Columbia (Central Coast), a former cannery town
 Mount Boswell, Alberta

England
 Boswell, a hamlet in Elkington, Lincolnshire

United States
 Boswell, Indiana, a town
 Boswell, Oklahoma, a town
 Boswell, Pennsylvania, a borough
 Boswell Bay, Alaska, a place in Alaska

People
 Boswell (surname)
James Boswell (1740–1795), Scottish lawyer, diarist, author, and biographer of Samuel Johnson
 Clan Boswell, a Lowland Scottish clan
 Boisil or Boswell (died 661), Christian saint and abbot
 Boswell Williams (1926–2014), Saint Lucian politician
Chris Boswell, placekicker for the Pittsburgh Steelers

Education
 The Boswells School, a secondary school in Chelmsford, Essex, England
 Boswell High School, Fort Worth, Texas, United States
 Boswell School, Izard County, Arkansas, United States, a school building on the National Register of Historic Places

Other uses
 Boswell Observatory, at Doane College in Nebraska, US
 Boswells of Oxford, or simply Boswells, a department store in Oxford, England
 Boswell baronets, an extinct title in the Baronetage of the United Kingdom
 Boswell (horse), a Thoroughbred racehorse
 Boswell: A Modern Comedy, a novel by Stanley Elkin

See also
 Boswell's Tavern, an 18th-century tavern near Gordonsville, Virginia, United States, on the National Register of Historic Places
 Boswellia, a genus of trees
 Boswil, a municipality in Switzerland